Papillocithara hebes is a species of sea snail in the family Mangeliidae.

Description
The length of the shell attains 13.5 mm, its diameter 5 mm.

Distribution
This marine species can be found in Southern Africa and Mozambique.

References

 Kilburn R.N. 1992. Turridae (Mollusca: Gastropoda) of southern Africa and Mozambique. Part 6. Subfamily Mangeliinae, section 1. Annals of the Natal Museum, 33: 461–575.  page(s): 517–519

External links
 

hebes
Gastropods described in 1992